Garmsar (also Romanized as Garmsār is a city in and the capital of Garmsar County, Semnan Province, Iran. At the 2006 census, its population was 38,891, in 10,951 families.

It lies on the edge of Dasht-e Kavir, Iran's largest desert. Many people in the city commute to Tehran due to its proximity. Ghasre Bahram, The Stone Way, Stonvand Castle, the Sar Darre Mountains, and Kavir Desert National Park are tourist attractions located in the area.

People

Garmsar has a Tat and Persian majority. Persian and Tati are the main languages in Garmsar County. Other languages such as Azeri and Kurdish are still spoken by older people from different ethnicities like Osanlu(azari) and Pazuki, Gharachorloo and Shadloo (kurdish) in the nearby villages. Younger generation speaks Persian along with their native language.

Climate
Garmsar has a hot desert climate (BWh) in Köppen climate classification and (BW) in Trewartha climate classification.

Notable people

 Amir Arsalan Motahari
 Jalil Zandi
 Ali Sorena

Agricultural sector

The Hablehrood river originating from Dalichai-Firouzkooh flows to the plateau of Garmsar. Its water is extensively used for agriculture. Since salt water mixes with Hablehrood before its arrival to the city, the water is not fit for drinking. Hablehrood is the only permanent river in Semnan province. Thanks to the water provided by Hablehrood, people in Garmsar grow wheat, barley, cotton and yellow melon. Garmsar is known across Iran for its sweet and crispy yellow melons.

Water management

The many river branches and the irrigated fields provide recharge to the aquifer. Since ancient times, groundwater in the Garmsar area has been exploited by ghanats (qanats, karezes) and shallow wells, mainly for irrigation of agricultural land, but also for household purposes. In the last decades, the number of deep-wells has increased sharply and the ghanats have fallen dry.

Yet, at the fringes of the fan, problems of waterlogging occur owing to irrigation losses higher up that are transported through the aquifer to the lower lying areas causing shallow watertables, while the evaporation from the shallow watertable brings salts into the rootzone which henceforth is salinizing. As a result, the agriculture in the fringes suffers low yields or is impossible.

Cuisine
The traditional cuisine of the city is called Tahchin. It differs from the classic Tahchin common in other cities. Tahchin is a tasty and fragrant rice-based food where marinated raw meat is slowly cooked inside the rice over a low flame for several hours.

Education
 Adiban Institute of Higher Education
 Alla ed Dolle Haji Abad, Garmsar
 Amirkabir University of Technology - Garmsar Branch
 Elmi Kaar Bordi, Garmsar
 Islamic Azad University of Garmsar
 Payame Noor University
 University of Garmasar

References

External links 

Populated places in Garmsar County
Cities in Semnan Province